Robert J. "Rocky" Fitzsimmons (born March 5, 1979) is an American attorney and politician from the state of West Virginia. A member of the Democratic Party, Fitzsimmons served in the West Virginia Senate for the 1st district.

Fitzsimmons attended Washington University in St. Louis, graduating with a bachelor of science magna cum laude degree in biomedical engineering. He enrolled at the Wake Forest University School of Law, where he received his Juris Doctor. As an attorney, he joined the Fitzsimmons Law Firm, based in Warwood, West Virginia, with other members of his family.

Fitzsimmons was appointed to the West Virginia Senate in December 2012 by Governor Earl Ray Tomblin, replacing Orphy Klempa.

On November 4, 2014, Fitzsimmons was defeated for reelection by Republican Delegate Ryan Ferns.

References

External links
 

Living people
1979 births
Politicians from Wheeling, West Virginia
Democratic Party West Virginia state senators
McKelvey School of Engineering alumni
Wake Forest University School of Law alumni
West Virginia lawyers
Lawyers from Wheeling, West Virginia
Washington University in St. Louis alumni